The Guardians is a novel by Lynn Abbey published in 1982.

Plot summary
The Guardians is a novel in which rifts in time and space open in New York and Britain.

Reception
Greg Costikyan reviewed The Guardians in Ares Magazine #14 and commented that "The Guardians is a book which both mainstream and science fiction readers will be comfortable with. The plot hangs together well, the character are well-realized, and Abbey manages to transmit a sense of the horror of the situation without recourse to violence or nausea."

References

1982 novels